Staurochlamys is a genus of flowering plants in the tribe Neurolaeneae within the family Asteraceae.

Species
The only known species is  Staurochlamys burchellii, native to Brazil (States of Tocantins, Goiás, Maranhão, Piauí)

References

Monotypic Asteraceae genera
Neurolaeneae
Endemic flora of Brazil
Taxa named by John Gilbert Baker